W. A. Silva (16 January 1890 – 3 May 1957) was a best-selling author of Sinhala literature. Wellawattearachchige Abraham Silva was born in Wellawatte, Colombo. After receiving a formal Sinhala education, he wrote his first novel, "Siriyalatha", at the age of 16.

After studying Sanskrit and Sinhala under Pelane Sri Vajiragnana Thero and reading world literature in his spare time while working as a clerk, Silva wrote Lakshmi, his second novel, in 1922. He continued to write popular novels and short story collections. Several of his novels include Kalae Handa (the first Sinhala novel to be made a movie) and Hingana Kolla, which was also made into a movie.

Silva edited the Siri Sara (1919–1923) and Nuwana (1940–1946) magazines, as well as a weekly newspaper, Lanka Samaya (1933). After his death, High Street in Wellawatte was renamed W. A. Silva Mawatha in his honour.

His residence 'Silvermere' at No. 126, W A Silva Mawatha, Wellawatte has now been turned in to a museum containing artifacts of his time, hand written manuscripts, copies of novels, and other memorabilia.

Publications 
 Siriyalatha (1907)
 Lakshmi (1922)
 Hingana Kolla (1923)
 Pasal Guruvari (1924)
 Deiyanne Rate (1926)
 Kele Handha (1933)
 Daivayogaya (1936)
 Sunethra (1936)
 Vijayaba Kollaya (1938)
 Radala Piliruwe
 Handa pane
 Julihatha
 Ridihavadiya
 Lensuva
 Sakviti Raja
 Amurtha Hasthaya
 Dalakumar
 Arabian Nights (translation)
 Maya Yogaya (play)
 Ramayanaya (translation)

References

1890 births
1957 deaths
Sri Lankan novelists
Sinhalese writers
20th-century novelists